Trimusculus reticulatus is a species of small air-breathing sea snail or false limpet, a pulmonate gastropod mollusc in the family Trimusculidae, the button snails.

References

Trimusculidae
Gastropods described in 1835